The 2006–2007 Israeli Final Four, the second Israeli Final Four was held at Yad Eliyahu Arena, Tel Aviv, Israel on 29 and 31 May 2007 to determine the winner of the 2006–2007 Israeli League. The contestants were Maccabi Tel Aviv, the 2005–2006 Israeli League champion, Hapoel Jerusalem, the 2005–2006 Israeli League runner-up and the 2006–2007 Israeli State Cup winner, Bnei Hasharon, the 2006–2007 Israeli State Cup runner-up and Hapoel Galil Elyon. Maccabi Tel Aviv won their 47th Israeli League crown, beating Hapoel Jerusalem 80-78 in the final.

Venue
The Yad Eliyahu Arena is an indoor sports arena in Tel Aviv, Israel. Opened in 1963 with its seating capacity varying from 5,000 to 11,700, it had hosted the 1971–1972 FIBA European Champions Cup final, the 1993–1994 FIBA European Championship Final Four, the 2003–2004 Euroleague Final Four and the 2005-2006 Israeli Final Four.

Bracket

Semifinals
All times are in Israel Summer Time.

Semifinal 1

Semifinal 2

Third-place playoff

Final

1